Burn is the second EP released by the American anarcho street punk band Defiance, released on Consensus Reality Records in 1995.

Track listing 
A side
Success Unattainable - 1:47
Concealed Genocide - 3:13

B side
Hands Of The Few - 2:26
Kept Docile - 2:31

Defiance (punk band) albums
1995 EPs